The Royal Brunei Police Cadet Corps (Malay: Pasukan Kadet Polis Diraja Brunei) is a youth movement in Brunei Darussalam. The membership requires students or teachers from a secondary public or private schools from Brunei Darussalam, or a volunteer with status as a permanent residents or Bruneian nationality.

As of 2012, the number enrolled reached 1,435 in every public and private school in Brunei Darussalam. The organisation itself is one of the most fastest growing and highest members in Brunei Darussalam. Members' ages ranged from 13 to 60.

History 
The organisation was established on 8 March 1977 at Police Training Centre (Pusat Latihan Polis), Jalan Aman, with 90 student members and four students from Sekolah Menengah Jamalul Alam, Sekolah Tinggi Pengiran Raja Isteri and Maktab SOAS.

It was also known during that time as "Pasokan Kedet Polis Di-raja Brunei"

Activities 
Their activity often consists marching but they also held a camping trip in recreation park or in the forests once in a year and they hold a marching competition between schools or other youth movements. Twice in three years, they participate in Outward Bound Brunei Darussalam. They also rarely hold shooting sessions.

Training

Physical training 
Every Friday morning, the cadets' training consists of marching. Squad leaders give drill commands to the cadets.

Cleaning campaign 
The cadets frequently hold a cleaning campaign mostly in Muslim cemeteries, schools or recreational parks.

Rank promotion 
The candidates will be sent to a corps training centre. The instructor or drill sergeants teach the candidates to give drill commands or perform march drills. They also have a physical and writing test.

Recruitment 
The new cadets have to learn march drill movements from their seniors and be measured for their uniform clothing.

Singapore - Brunei Cadet Exchange Program 
Since 2013, Brunei and Singapore Police Cadets have had opportunities to meet each other hence boost ties between the two countries. Every year, cadets visit Brunei and learn the country's culture.

Uniform 
In 2017, new uniform designs were introduced to replace the grey khaki uniform, with two total uniforms with their own purpose.

No 1. uniform 
Also known as a duty uniform, this uniform quickly replaced the grey khaki uniform. It was first used during 96th Brunei Police Anniversary parade, and was widely used for the first time during 33rd Brunei National Day. The uniform designs are:

 dark blue tops and pants, with pockets
 black beret with 2017 "RBPCF" logo
 black boots with clean polished surface until a person's reflection can seen
 black belts around the waist
 fabric rank epaulets at top's shoulder with PKP title engraved.

No 2. uniform

Physical training attire 

The cadets use this attire mostly during marching practice and during sport events or camping. It is a white plain shirt with the corps logo, black sport pants or track suit pants, and sport shoes.

Ranks 
Cadets

The ranks that a student can receive as a cadet in their secondary school are as follows:
 Cadet - analogous to Private/Police Constable
 Lance Corporal
 Corporal
 Sergeant
 Staff Sergeant

Instructors & officers

This category of ranks comprises from student volunteers to volunteers, teachers and also staff personnel from the Schools. Ranks are as follows:
 Sergeant major
 Inspector
 Chief Inspector
 Assistant Superintendent of Police
 Deputy Superintendent of Police

References 

Law enforcement in Brunei